Get Ya Mind Correct is the debut studio album  by rappers Paul Wall & Chamillionaire of The Color Changin' Click, released when they were both on the Paid In Full Label. It was notable in the Houston underground rap scene. The album peaked at #67 on the BillboardTop R&B/Hip-Hop Albums chart. The album was nominated for Indie Album of the Year in The Source magazine.

There's a Chopped and Screwed version by DJ Michael '5000' Watts for Swishahouse.

Track listing

References

 

2002 albums
Paul Wall albums
Chamillionaire albums
The Color Changin' Click albums